The 1979 ATP Championship, also known as the Cincinnati Open, was a men's tennis tournament played on outdoor hard courts at the Lindner Family Tennis Center in Mason, Ohio in the United States that was part of the 1979 Colgate-Palmolive Grand Prix. It was the 79th edition of the tournament and was held from August 20 through August 26, 1979. Seventh-seeded Peter Fleming won the singles title.

Finals

Singles
 Peter Fleming defeated  Roscoe Tanner 6–4, 6–2
 It was Fleming's 1st singles title of the year and the 2nd of his career.

Doubles
 Brian Gottfried /  Ilie Năstase defeated  Bob Lutz /  Stan Smith 1–6, 6–3, 7–6

References

External links
 
 ITF tournament edition details
 ATP tournament profile

Cincinnati Open
Cincinnati Masters
1979 in American tennis
Cincin